The Torry Battery is an artillery battery near Torry in Aberdeen, Scotland, which has overlooked the city's harbour since 1860. It was originally constructed for nine guns with a defensible barracks at the rear. In 1881 the battery mounted three 10-inch Smooth bore guns and five 68-Pounder Smooth bore guns. 

The battery was adapted for two 6-inch Breech Loading (BL) guns which were mounted by 1906. These were used for practise by the local artillery volunteer unit, the 1st Aberdeenshire Royal Garrison Artillery (Volunteers).

Both guns were operational during the First World War.

During the First and Second World Wars it was used to defend the city and was finally decommissioned in 1956.  It is now a scheduled monument.

References

Bibliography
Sinclair, Donald, 1907. The History of the Aberdeen Volunteers, Aberdeen Daily Journal Office, Aberdeen

Further reading
Ourpasthistory.com
Leopardmag.co.uk
BBC feature

Buildings and structures in Aberdeen
Scheduled Ancient Monuments in Aberdeen
Artillery batteries